A list of films produced in Hong Kong in 1992:.

1992

See also 
 1992 in Hong Kong

References

External links
 IMDB list of Hong Kong films
 Hong Kong films of 1992 at HKcinemamagic.com

1992
Hong Kong
1992 in Hong Kong